Josh Gattis (born January 15, 1984) is an American football coach and former player who is the offensive coordinator at the University of Maryland.

Playing career
Gattis was born in Durham, North Carolina. He played college football at Wake Forest as a safety. As a junior in 2005, he recorded five interceptions and 72 tackles, and was awarded second-team All-ACC. His senior year in 2006 was one of Wake's greatest seasons of all time, as the team won the ACC for the second time in school history and played in the school's first Orange Bowl. He recorded five interceptions and 82 tackles on the year, and was named first-team All-ACC. 

Gattis was drafted by the Jacksonville Jaguars in the fifth round of the 2007 NFL Draft with the 150th overall pick. He was released and later signed with the Chicago Bears, where he played in five games and recorded one tackle in 2007.

Coaching career
After serving as a graduate assistant under Butch Davis at North Carolina for one season, Gattis was hired as the wide receivers coach at Western Michigan in 2011. While on the Broncos staff, he coached consensus All-American wide receiver Jordan White.

In 2012, he was hired by Vanderbilt as wide receivers coach and offensive recruiting coordinator. Wide receiver Jordan Matthews was awarded first-team All-SEC in both years Gattis was wide receivers coach at Vanderbilt. Gattis followed head coach James Franklin as he moved from Vanderbilt to Penn State in 2014, and assumed the same role with the Nittany Lions.

On January 25, 2018, it was announced he had been hired as the wide receivers coach at Alabama. He served as co-offensive coordinator (with Mike Locksley) and wide receivers coach during the 2018 season at Alabama, helping to oversee the third-highest scoring offense in the country. In his role as wide receivers coach, he oversaw Jerry Jeudy, who became the second consensus All-American wide-out to be coached by Gattis, and first to win the Biletnikoff Award as the nation's best wide receiver.

On January 10, 2019, Gattis was hired to be the offensive coordinator at Michigan. In 2021, Gattis won the Broyles Award as the top assistant coach in college football, leading the Wolverines' offense to a Big Ten Conference Championship and an appearance in the College Football Playoff.

On February 9th, 2022, Gattis was hired to be the offensive coordinator at the University of Miami Hurricanes. On January 27, 2023, it was announced Gattis had been fired by Miami.

On March 2, 2023, Gattis was hired to be the offensive coordinator at Maryland.

References

External links
 Michigan profile
 Alabama profile
 

1984 births
Living people
American football safeties
Alabama Crimson Tide football coaches
Chicago Bears players
Jacksonville Jaguars players
Miami Hurricanes football coaches
Michigan Wolverines football coaches
North Carolina Tar Heels football coaches
Penn State Nittany Lions football coaches
Vanderbilt Commodores football coaches
Wake Forest Demon Deacons football players
Western Michigan Broncos football coaches
Sportspeople from Durham, North Carolina
Coaches of American football from North Carolina
Players of American football from North Carolina
African-American coaches of American football
African-American players of American football
21st-century African-American sportspeople